The Oxford Law Society (informally referred to as "LawSoc") is a student society at the University of Oxford, providing a platform for students to develop their understanding of a career in the legal industry.

It publishes a termly magazine, Verdict, and past contributors include Cherie Blair, Baroness Hale and Baron Goldsmith.

Past presidents 
Notable previous presidents include English judge and President of the Queen's Bench Division, Sir Brian Leveson, Foreign Office Minister Alistair Burt MP, former London Mayoral Candidate Steven Norris and investment fund manager Nicola Horlick.

References 

History of Oxford
Culture in Oxford
Legal education in the United Kingdom